This is a list of the NCAA indoor champions in a long distance event.  It is the longest race on the NCAA indoor track program.  Generally that was the 3 mile run until 1982, and after 6 years of dormancy, the 5000 meters being contested since 1989.  Hand timing was used until 1975, starting in 1976 fully automatic timing was used.

Champions
Key
y=yards
w=wind aided
A=Altitude assisted

Three mile run

5000 Meters

References

NCAA Indoor Track and Field Championships
5000 metres